Kazimierz Funk (February 23, 1884 – November 19, 1967), commonly anglicized as Casimir Funk, was a Polish-American biochemist generally credited with being among the first to formulate (in 1912) the concept of vitamins, which he called "vital amines" or "vitamines".

Achievements
After reading an article by the Dutchman Christiaan Eijkman that indicated that persons who ate brown rice were less vulnerable to beri-beri than those who ate only the fully milled product, Funk tried to isolate the substance responsible, and he succeeded. Because that substance contained an amine group, he called it "vitamine". It was later to be known as vitamin B3 (niacin), though he thought that it would be thiamine (vitamin B1) and described it as "anti-beri-beri-factor". In 1911 he published his first paper in English, on dihydroxyphenylalanine. Funk was sure that more than one substance like Vitamin B1 existed, and in his 1912 article for the Journal of State Medicine, he proposed the existence of at least four vitamins: one preventing beriberi (“antiberiberi”); one preventing scurvy (“antiscorbutic”); one preventing pellagra (“antipellagric”); and one preventing rickets (“antirachitic”). From there, Funk published a book, The Vitamines, in 1912, and later that year received a Beit Fellowship to continue his research.

Funk proposed the hypothesis that other diseases, such as rickets, pellagra, coeliac disease, and scurvy could also be cured by vitamins.

Funk was an early investigator of the problem of pellagra. He suggested that a change in the method of milling corn was responsible for the outbreak of pellagra, but no attention was paid to his article on this subject.

The "e" at the end of "vitamine" was later removed, when it was realized that vitamins need not be nitrogen-containing amines.

He postulated the existence of other essential nutrients, which became known as vitamins B1, B2, C, and D.

In 1936 he determined the molecular structure of thiamine, though he was not the first to isolate it.

Funk also conducted research into hormones, diabetes, peptic ulcers, and the biochemistry of cancer.

After returning to the United States, in 1940 he became president of the Funk Foundation for Medical Research.  He spent his last years studying the causes of neoplasms ("cancers").

Funk Award
The Polish Institute of Arts and Sciences of America (PIASA) annually honors Polish-American scientists with the Casimir Funk Natural Sciences Award. Past winners have included Nobel Laureate Roald Hoffmann, Aleksander Wolszczan, Hilary Koprowski, Peter T. Wolczanski, Wacław Szybalski, Zbyszek Darzynkiewicz and Benoit Mandelbrot.

References

Further reading

Harow, Benjamin CASIMIR FUNK-Pioneer in Vitamins and Hormones. Dodd, Mead & Company, New York, N. Y., 1955. 209 pages.
Biography
Review of Harow's biography at pubmedcentral, pdf
Biography at FAQs, nutrition accessed Dec 2006.
 
 
"Funk, Casimir", Complete Dictionary of Scientific Biography, vol. 5, Detroit, Charles Scribner's Sons, 2008 pp. 208–9. Gale Virtual Reference Library. Web. 19 July 2012.

External links 
"Vitamins – Jewish Discoverer" , (2017).

1884 births
1967 deaths
American biochemists
University of Bern alumni
Jewish chemists
Jewish biologists
Polish biologists
Polish chemists
People from Warsaw
Scientists from New York (state)
Jewish American scientists
American people of Polish-Jewish descent
Vitamin researchers
Polish emigrants to the United States